Ten of Swords is a Minor Arcana tarot card. Tarot cards are used throughout much of Europe to play tarot card games. In English-speaking countries, where the games are largely unknown, tarot cards came to be utilized primarily for divinatory purposes.

Meaning and symbolism 

In the upright or positive light, the ten of swords represents destruction, being pinned down by a multitude of things or situations. The person lying on the ground, defeated and bleeding, may also represent a feeling of hopelessness and being trapped by emotions or mental anguish, since swords represent strife and the mind.

Dark clouds hovering above the person signify despair and a bleak situation. However, upon closer examination of the images in the Rider–Waite card, any death or destruction, like all things, may not be permanent. There is hope in spite of the situation; the golden sky in the distance suggests that the current situation is bad, and things will improve.

In the reversed state, the card indicates a troubling situation that will continue for a significant amount of time. The card suggests that the subject should not despair in difficult times, to avoid ruining future prospects for success.

In popular culture 

There was a Bob Dylan bootleg compilation called Ten of Swords released on ten 12 inch vinyl records, which consisted of various unreleased material of the artist.

A track off the Arsis album Starve for the Devil is entitled "The Ten of Swords".

In the King of the Hill episode The Witches of East Arlen, Bobby foretells Bill's future with tarot cards and picks the Ten of Swords and explains that represents advantage, profit and success, much to Bill's delight. But then Bobby reveals it's upside down and says that it represents pain, affliction, tears, sadness and desolation, making Bill cry.

The final episode of AMC's television series Halt and Catch Fire is titled "Ten of Swords"; it is a reference to Lee Pace's character Joe MacMillan bottoming out in his career and being "reborn" in the final scene as a college professor.

The 2020 X-Men event in Marvel Comics is called X of Swords, and features tarot cards and themes.

The 2021 Release All Things from Antagonist A.D. features a track titled Ten of Swords. The track discusses feelings of hopelessness, despair, and self-loathing.

References

External links
 Ten of Swords Tarot Card Meanings | Biddy Tarot

Suit of Swords